Khoda Qoli (also Romanized as Khodā Qolī, Khodā Qolīhā, and Khuda Quli) is a village in Aladagh Rural District, in the Central District of Bojnord County, North Khorasan Province, Iran. At the 2006 census, its population was 665, in 165 families.

References 

Populated places in Bojnord County